The discography of American singer and songwriter Willy DeVille includes, as well as his solo recordings, recordings released by his band Mink DeVille in the period from 1977 to 1985. It consists of fourteen studio albums, three live albums, fifteen compilation albums, twenty-two singles, and one extended play (EP).

Albums

Studio albums

Live albums

Compilation albums

Notes

Extended plays

Singles

Video albums
 1986: Live at The Savoy (Channel 5; CFV 00092)
 1993: From the Bottom Line to the Olympia
 2002: 25 Years of Heart & Soul (EMS)
 2003: The Berlin Concerts (EMS)
 2006: Live in the Lowlands (Eagle Rock)
 2008: Live at Montreux 1982 (Eagle Vision)
 2009: Live at Montreux 1994 (Eagle  Vision)
 2012: Willy DeVille – Still Alive [3-Disc DVD Box Set, MEYER RECORDS no 184]

Other album appearances

Soundtracks
 1979: Hardcore (Columbia); "Easy Slider", "Guardian Angel"
 1980: Cruising (Columbia; JC 36410): "Heat of the Moment," "It's So Easy," "Pullin' My String"
 1984: The Pope of Greenwich Village (United Artists); "Just To Walk That Little Girl Home"
 1987: The Princess Bride (Vertigo; 832 864-1): "Storybook Love"
 2007: Death Proof (Maverick, Warner Bros.; AWAR 106172): "It's So Easy"

Various artist compilation albums
 1976: Live at CBGB’s (Omfug): "Cadillac Moon," "Let Me Dream if I Want To," "Change It Comes" (Mink DeVille)
 1993: Brace Yourself!: A Tribute to Otis Blackwell  (Shanachie; B000006JBF): “Daddy Rolling Stone”
 1994: Tribute to Édith Piaf (Amherst Records; AMH 5500-2): "The Lovers” (Les Amants)"
 1995: I Only Wrote This Song for You: A Tribute to Johnny Thunders (Castle Essential): "You Can't Put Your Arms Around a Memory"
 1999: The Orleans Records Story (Orleans Records; OR 2311): "Jump Steady Come My Way"

Guest appearances
 1995: ¡Vamos! (album by Celtas Cortos) (Dro Atlantic): "Cuéntame un cuento" (half English, half Spanish version of this song)
 1996: Hogshead Cheese (Appaloosa Records; AP 118-2): "Hymn in D" (composer)
 2001: A Crooked Mile (album by Blue Love Monkey) (Cracker Records; 634479413025): DeVille served as producer, as well as playing harp and percussion instruments
 2006: Crossing Times and Continents (Centaurus; 9500017), by Eberhard Schoener and Friends (sings "Yvonne")

References

25. The Pope of Greenwich Village.... Night street scene when Micky Rourke dances with Daryl Hannah

External links

Rock music discographies
Discographies of American artists
Discography